Events in the year 1924 in Turkey.

Parliament
 2nd Parliament of Turkey

Incumbents
President – Kemal Atatürk
Prime Minister 
 İsmet İnönü (up to 21 November)
Fethi Okyar (from 21 November)
 Leader of the opposition – Kâzım Karabekir (from 8 December)

Ruling party and the main opposition
 Ruling party – Republican People's Party (CHP)
Main opposition – Progressive Republican Party (TCF) (from 9 November)

Cabinet
1st government of Turkey (up to 6 March)
2nd government of Turkey (6 March – 21 November)
3rd government of Turkey (from 21 November)

Events
31 January – Treaty of Lausanne was approved by the Italian parliament
29 February – Last public appearance of the caliph Abdülmecit II
3 March – 
 The Ottoman Caliphate was abolished
 The Ministry of Sharia and the Foundations was abolished; the Directorate of Religious Affairs and the Directorate General of Foundations were established
 Unification and secularization of the education system
 Depolitization of the army 
6 March – İsmet İnönü formed a new cabinet, because the ministries of General staff and the religion (şerriye) had been abolished on the 3rd of March
8 March – Religious courts abolished
15 April – Treaty of Lausanne signed by the British King
17 April – Treaty of Lausanne approved by the Japanese parliament
24 April –  New constitution
25 August – Turkey–League of Nations agreement on the Mosul issue
26 August – İşbank was founded
13 September – Pasinler earthquake
26 October – An internal political crisis named “Crisis of the commanders” because some high-ranking military personnel refused to give up their seats in the parliament (see 3 March)
9 November – Progressive Republican Party (TCF) was founded
21 November – After İsmet İnönü’s resignation Fethi Okyar formed the new cabinet
8 December – Kâzım Karabekir was elected as the president of TCF

Births
27 January – Rauf Denktaş, Leaders of Cypriot Turks
22 March – Osman F. Seden, film director
27 March – Bülent Oran, actor
28 September – Lale Oraloğlu, theatre actress
29 September – Şükrü Elekdağ, diplomat, politician
1 November – Süleyman Demirel, prime minister (30th,  31st, 32nd, 39th, 41st, 43rd and 49th government of Turkey) 
15 December – Ruhi Sarıalp, triple jump athlete
22 December – Sevim Tekeli, academic and historian

Deaths
31 May – Fikriye (born in 1887), Atatürk’s relative and girlfriend 
25 October – Ziya Gökalp (born in 1876), sociologist, writer
5 November – Fatma Pesend Hanım (born in 1876), a wife of Ottoman sultan Abdülhamit II

Gallery

See also
Turkey at the 1924 Summer Olympics

References

 
Years of the 20th century in Turkey
Turkey
Turkey
Turkey